Michał Sławuta (born February 10, 1977) is a Polish former football goalkeeper and currently a goalkeeper coach for FC Haka in Ykkönen, the second highest level of football in Finland.

References

Living people
1977 births
Polish footballers
Polish expatriate footballers
Expatriate footballers in Finland
Expatriate men's footballers in Denmark
Expatriate footballers in Sweden
Veikkausliiga players
Allsvenskan players
ŁKS Łódź players
FC Lahti players
Porin Palloilijat players
FC Midtjylland players
Ljungskile SK players
Sportspeople from Częstochowa
Association football goalkeepers
Musan Salama players